Cooking Mama (stylized as cookıng mama) is a video game series and media franchise owned by Cooking Mama Limited. The series is a cookery simulation-styled minigame compilation of many  video games and adventures for Nintendo gaming platforms. Generally, the gameplay revolves around performing different kitchen tasks, through the instructions of "Mama", to cook various meals. The series so far consists of five main games on Nintendo DS and Nintendo 3DS, two spin-offs on Wii, two spin offs on DS, and a spin off on 3DS. It also spins off into the Gardening Mama series. The original Cooking Mama game was also ported to iOS. A sixth main series game, Cooking Mama: Cookstar, was released for the Nintendo Switch and PlayStation 4 in 2021.

Gameplay

Gameplay involves the player following the instructions of the titular "Mama" to cook various meals. This is performed by using the device's controller, typically the touch screen, to perform various kitchen tasks such as chopping vegetables, slicing meat, flipping food in pans, and arranging the final items onto a plate. Each of these tasks is accomplished by completing a minigame which usually lasts less than 10 seconds. The series' gameplay structure consists of the player progressing through a series of short minigames.

Each minigame represents a different activity in the meal preparation, such as mixing, frying, or chopping the provided ingredients.  The minigame mechanics themselves range from quickly drawing parallel lines in order to chop items, to a rhythm game where ingredients are added to a skillet or the heat is adjusted at precisely the right time. If the player makes a serious blunder or time expires without sufficient progress being made, that step in the cooking process is considered a failure.  When this happens, a graphic of an angry "Mama" with flames erupting from her eyes is displayed, along with the caption "Don't worry, Mama will fix it!".

Completing a dish can require playing one minigame, or as many as a dozen. The player's performance is rated when each dish is finished, based on the average result of each minigame. Depending on the final score, the game may award the player a bronze, silver or gold medal. The highest medal earned for each dish is recorded and displayed next to each item on the selection screen.

Games

Cooking Mama (2006)

Cooking Mama is the first game in the franchise. It was first released for the Nintendo DS in March 2006, and it was later ported to iOS as Cooking Mama: Let’s Cook! in 2015.

Cooking Mama: Cook Off (2007)

Cooking Mama: Cook Off, a spin off made for Wii, was released for the Wii in Japan on February 8, 2007, replacing the original's touchscreen control with use of the Wii Remote to guide the cooking activities. It was later released in North America on March 20, 2007 and on May 11, 2007 in Europe.

Cooking Mama 2: Dinner with Friends (2007)

Cooking Mama 2: Dinner with Friends, the second Nintendo DS game in the series, was first released in November 2007. Along with new recipes, this title expands the total number of different minigames and adds several new gameplay modes.

Cooking Mama: World Kitchen (2008)

Cooking Mama: World Kitchen for the Wii was released on November 18, 2008, and was the second Wii spin off title.

Gardening Mama (2009)

Gardening Mama is a spin off released for Nintendo DS on March 19, 2009 that focuses on fruits and vegetables.

Cooking Mama 3: Shop & Chop (2009)

Cooking Mama 3: Shop & Chop, the third Nintendo DS game in the series, had a hands-on demo available at E3 2009, and was first released in October 2009.

Crafting Mama (2010)

Crafting Mama is a spin off released for Nintendo DS on October 26, 2010 that focuses on crafting.

Babysitting Mama (2010)

Babysitting Mama is a spin off released for Nintendo Wii on November 5, 2010 that focuses on babysitting.

Camping Mama (2011)

Camping Mama: Outdoor Adventures, commonly known as just Camping Mama, is a spin off released for DS in 2011 that focuses on camping.

Cooking Mama 4: Kitchen Magic (2011)

Cooking Mama 4: Kitchen Magic, the fourth main entry in the series and the first entry to be published on the Nintendo 3DS, was first released in November 2011.

Gardening Mama 2: Forest Friends (2013)

Gardening Mama 2: Forest Friends released for Nintendo 3DS on September 26, 2013, and is a sequel to the spin off title Gardening Mama.

Cooking Mama 5: Bon Appétit! (2013)

Cooking Mama 5: Bon Appétit!, the fifth main entry in the series and the second entry to be published on the Nintendo 3DS, was first released in November 2013.

Cooking Mama Sweet Shop (2017)
Cooking Mama: Sweet Shop is a spin off title released for Nintendo 3DS on May 18, 2017. The game focuses on baking sweet treats and managing a sweet shop to attract and satisfy customers.

Cooking Mama: Cookstar (2020)

Cooking Mama: Cookstar is the sixth main installment in the Cooking Mama series. The game was briefly released on the Nintendo Switch eShop on March 31, 2020, but was taken down just a few hours later due to legal issues between the publisher, Planet Entertainment, and the owner of the Cooking Mama IP, Office Create. The fact that the game released without a public announcement or press statement and was taken down so quickly led to speculation about the game’s development and if the game will ever be properly released. A PlayStation 4 version was also announced with the game’s initial announcement in August 2019, which was released on March 25, 2021, by Planet Entertainment. This was the first Cooking Mama game released on a platform to receive a third-party console release. In November 2022, an arbitration ruling declared Planet Entertainment was not authorized to release Cooking Mama: Cookstar, and that the rightsholders would work to remove the game from sale.

Cooking Mama: Cuisine! (2022)
Cooking Mama: Cuisine! was developed and published by Office Create and released for Apple Arcade on July 17, 2022.

Reception

As of 2011, the series has sold over 12 million copies worldwide.

Notes

References

External links
 Official website

 
Casual games
Cooking video games
Video games developed in Japan
Video game franchises
Video game franchises introduced in 2006